Francis Courtenay may refer to:

 Francis Courtenay (died 1638) (1576–1638), MP
 Francis Courtenay (died 1699), his grandson, MP
 Sir Francis Courtenay, 3rd Baronet (1617–1660), of the Courtenay baronets